Schistura hiranyakeshi is a freshwater fish. It was described in 2020.

Etymology 
The species was named after the river Hiranyakeshi.

Range 
The fish has only been found in large numbers in the temple pond of Amboli, near the source of the Hiranyakeshi river. The area has been declared a biodiversity heritage site by the state government.

References 

hiranyakeshi
Fish described in 2020